Tanbourit is a  village in the Sidon District of the South Governorate in Lebanon.

History

In 1875 Victor Guérin traveled in the region, and noted the village Tanbourit "beyond a ravine". The inhabitants were Maronites.

References

Bibliography

External links
Tanbourit, Localiban 

Populated places in Sidon District
Maronite Christian communities in Lebanon